Ian Brooke (born 1 March 1943) is an English former professional rugby league footballer who played in the 1960s and 1970s, and coached in the 1970s, 1980s and 1990s.

Background
Brooke was born in Plymouth, Devon.

Playing career

International honours
Ian Brooke won caps for Great Britain while at Bradford Northern in 1966 against Australia (3 matches), and New Zealand (2 matches), in 1967 against Australia (3 matches), in 1968 against France (2 matches), and in the 1968 Rugby League World Cup against Australia (1-try), France, and New Zealand (1-try).

Championship final appearances
Ian Brooke played right-, i.e. number 3, and scored two tries in Wakefield Trinity's 21-9 victory over St. Helens in the Championship Final replay during the 1966–67 season at Station Road, Swinton on Wednesday 10 May 1967, and played in the 17-10 victory over Hull Kingston Rovers in the Championship Final during the 1967–68 season at Headingley Rugby Stadium, Leeds on Saturday 4 May 1968.

Challenge Cup Final appearances
Ian Brooke played right-, i.e. number 3, and scored a try in Wakefield Trinity's 25-10 victory over Wigan in the 1963 Challenge Cup Final during the 1962–63 season at Wembley Stadium, London on Saturday 11 May 1963, in front of a crowd of 84,492, and played right-, i.e. number 3, in the 10-11 defeat by Leeds in the 1968 Challenge Cup "Watersplash" Final during the 1967–68 season at Wembley Stadium, London on Saturday 11 May 1968, in front of a crowd of 87,100.

County Cup Final appearances
Ian Brooke played right-, i.e. number 3, and scored a try in Bradford Northern's 17-8 victory over Hunslet in the 1965 Yorkshire County Cup Final during the 1965–66 season at Headingley Rugby Stadium, Leeds on Saturday 16 October 1965.

Transfer From Wakefield Trinity To Bradford Northern
Ian Brooke was transferred from Wakefield Trinity to Bradford Northern in the summer of 1964 for £2,750 (based on increases in average earnings, this would be approximately £96,360 in 2013).

Coaching career

Challenge Cup Final appearances
Ian Brooke was the coach in Bradford Northern's 14-33 defeat by Featherstone Rovers in the 1973 Challenge Cup Final during the 1972–73 season at Wembley Stadium, London on Saturday 12 May 1973, in front of a crowd of 72,395.

References

External links
!Great Britain Statistics at englandrl.co.uk (statistics currently missing due to not having appeared for both Great Britain, and England)
Rugby League Final 1963
Rugby Cup Final 1968
Photograph "Coach Ian Brook(e) gives a half time talk" at rlhp.co.uk
Photograph "Half time talk" at rlhp.co.uk
Photograph "Roy Castle meets the players" at rlhp.co.uk

1943 births
Living people
Bradford Bulls coaches
Bradford Bulls players
Doncaster R.L.F.C. coaches
English rugby league coaches
English rugby league players
Great Britain national rugby league team players
Huddersfield Giants coaches
Place of birth missing (living people)
Rugby league centres
Rugby league players from Devon
Rugby league wingers
Wakefield Trinity coaches
Wakefield Trinity players